Kacarević is a Serbian surname traditionally found in the Maleševo region in eastern North Macedonia. It may refer to:

Petar Kacarević, Serbian Chetnik commander from Berovo.
Veljko Kacarević, Serbian Orthodox priest from Berovo, a Serbian teacher in the Maleševo region in the 19th century, and manager of the Serbian schools in the region (fl. 1902).
Ilija Kacarević, Serbian Orthodox priest and the deputy of Berovo, alumni of the Prizren Seminary.

See also
Kačarević

References

Serbian surnames